James Lloyd may refer to:

Politicians 
James Lloyd (Maryland politician) (1745–1830), American senator from Maryland
James Lloyd (Massachusetts politician) (1769–1831), American senator from Massachusetts
James Tilghman Lloyd (1857–1944), American congressman from Missouri
James M. Lloyd (1886–1969), American politician from South Dakota
James F. Lloyd (1922–2012), American congressman from California
James Monteith Lloyd, administrator of Grenada (1957–1962), see list of colonial governors of Grenada
James R. Lloyd (1950–1989), American politician in Pennsylvania
Sir James Lloyd, 1st Baronet (1762–1844), Sussex landowner, militia officer and Member of Parliament
Jim Lloyd (born 1954), Australian politician from New South Wales

Others 
James Lloyd (convict) (1825–1898), convict transported to Western Australia
James Lloyd (obstetrician) (1728–1810), American surgeon and obstetrician
James Lloyd (artist) (1905–1974), English landscape painter
James Lloyd (footballer) (1861–?), Welsh footballer
James Lloyd, convicted British serial rapist known as the Rotherham shoe rapist
Jimmy Lloyd (boxer) (1939–2013), British boxer
Jimmy Lloyd (actor) (1918-1988) US actor
Jimmy Lloyd, recording pseudonym of Jimmie Logsdon (1922–2001), American singer
James Lloyd (portrait artist) (born 1971), British portrait artist
Lil' Cease (James Lloyd, Jr., born 1977), American rapper

See also
Lloyd James (disambiguation)